The Steyr IWS 2000 is an Austrian single-shot bolt-action anti-materiel rifle produced by Steyr Mannlicher. IWS stands for Infantry Weapon System. Like many anti-tank rifles, it is actually a smoothbore weapon and not a true rifle. This can help accelerate projectiles and increase ballistic effectiveness, but the lack of rifling imparting inertial stability requires the projectile to have stabilizing fins. It is chambered in a 15.2×169 mm armor-piercing fin-stabilized discarding-sabot cartridge, and is the first man-portable rifle to use this type of ammunition.

The first variant of the weapon was the proposed AMR 5075 (AMR standing for anti-materiel rifle). It was to fire the same type of ammunition as the IWS 2000 and to use a 5-round detachable box magazine. However, that version did not pass the proposal stage.

Design
This mechanism, usually found in shotguns, helps manage the heavy recoil forces of the 15.2 mm Steyr APFSDS round due to its damping effect that allows for force distribution over a longer period of time. Another unusual feature of this weapon is the movement of the barrel. After firing, the barrel recoils into a shock-absorbing hydro-pneumatic sleeve much like those found on a LG 1 Mark II 105 mm Howitzer. The IWS 2000 also uses a multi-baffle muzzle brake to distribute muzzle energy and further reduce recoil, similar to that used on the D-30 2A18M 122 mm towed howitzer. The entire rifle body is made up of a combination of high-tension plastics and superlight polymers to increase manageability and cut down on weight. The smoothbore barrel is easily detached and packed away for increased mobility. The APFSDS round is inserted from the side of the weapon, much like with usual single-shot rifles.

Ammunition
The projectile is a 20-gram, 15.2 mm fin-stabilized discarding-sabot type with armor-piercing capability which the IWS 2000 was specifically designed to fire only. It contains a dart-shaped penetrator of either tungsten carbide or depleted uranium, capable of piercing 40 mm of rolled homogeneous armor at a range of 1,000 m, as well as causing secondary fragmentation. The cartridge consists of a plastic case, a steel head, and a plastic sabot shell around the penetrator, and has a maximum diameter of 26 millimeters, at its base. The complete projectile assembly with its four sabot segments weighs 35 grams.

See also

List of sniper rifles

References

External links
 IWS 2000 (photo)
 Steyr AMR 5075
 Steyr IWS 2000
 Modern Firearms
 Scroll down for photos of IWS 2000
Small Arms Archive for Ammunition of IWS 2000

Flechette firearms
Sniper rifles of Austria
Anti-materiel rifles
Single-shot bolt-action rifles